Echium brevirame is a species of flowering plants of the family Boraginaceae. It is endemic to the Canary Islands, where it is restricted to the island of La Palma.

It is a low woody shrub, average height , maximum height . The leaves are leathery, spiny and lance-shaped. Its flowers are white and sit in a compact inflorescence.

References

brevirame
Flora of La Palma
Endemic flora of the Canary Islands
Garden plants of Africa